Joseph Hubert Priestley  (5 October 188331 October 1944) was a British lecturer in botany at University College, Bristol, and professor of botany and pro-vice-chancellor at the University of Leeds. He has been described as a gifted teacher who attracted many graduate research students to Leeds. He was the eldest child of a Tewkesbury head teacher and the elder brother of Raymond Priestley, the British geologist and Antarctic explorer. He was educated at his father's school and University College, Bristol. In 1904, he was appointed a lecturer in botany at the University College and published research on photosynthesis and the effect of electricity on plants. He was elected a fellow of the Linnean Society, and in 1910, he was appointed consulting botanist to the Bath and West and Southern Counties Society.

In 1911, he married Marion Ethel Young at Bristol, and in the same year, he was appointed professor of botany at the University of Leeds. He served in the British Army during World War I, receiving a commission as a captain. In August 1914, he was sent to France with the British Expeditionary Force, and for the remainder of the war, he was seconded to the Intelligence Corps. On his return to Leeds, he embarked on a programme of research that encompassed the structure and development of the growing points of plants, the effect of light on growth, cork formation, and plant propagation.

In 1922, he was appointed dean of the faculty of science, and in 1925, he was elected president of the Yorkshire Naturalists' Union. In the following year, he taught a postgraduate course at the University of California, Berkeley. He was an active member of the British Association, the British Bryological Society, and the Forestry Commission. In 1935, he was elected provicechancellor, serving in that role until 1939. He was the first warden to the male students at Leeds and organised many social activities, including a staff dancing class and "botanical parties". He was a passionate cricket player and captained the staff team at Leeds. He died after a long illness at his home in Weetwood, Leeds.

Early life 

He was the eldest child of eight children of Joseph Edward Priestlay, then head teacher of the school, and Henrietta, . His mother was the second surviving daughter of Richard Rice of Tewkesbury. They had met at the Methodist chapel, and had married on 22December 1881 at Tettenhall parish church, now in the city of Wolverhampton. The Priestley family name was spelt originally as "Priestlay". However, in the early 1900s, the name changes to "Priestley" and both spellings appear on family graves in Tewkesbury Cemetery.

In 1875, Priestley's father graduated from the University of London with a second class Bachelor of Arts degree in animal physiology. He was appointed head teacher of Abbey House school following the death of his father, Joseph Priestley, on 13November 1876, and remained as head until his retirement in 1917. He moved to Bristol and joined the staff of Grace, Darbyshire, and Todd, a local firm of accountants. He died on 9December 1921, aged 67, at a nursing home in Clifton, and was interred in Canford Cemetery, Westbury-on-Trym, near Bristol. Henrietta died on 24 September 1929, aged 76, at Bishopston, Bristol.

Priestley's brothers, Stanley and Donald, died on active service during World War I. Stanley left Tewkesbury in 1912 to follow Priestley to the University of Leeds where he became a member of the Officers' Training Corps. Donald was a commercial traveller working for their mother's family firm, William Rice and Company, corn millers and seed merchants at Tewkesbury. His brother, Raymond, was a geologist in Robert Falcon Scott's illfated Terra Nova Expedition to the Antarctic from 1910 to 1913.

Priestley's sisters were Edith, Doris, Joyce, and Olive. Edith married Charles Seymour "Silas" Wright and Doris married Thomas Griffith "Grif" Taylor, both of whom were members of Scott's expedition. Doris first met Taylor in July 1913, and at that time, was acting as Priestley's secretary. Joyce married Herbert William Merrell, who served with the Gloucester Regiment in World War I, and in later life, was an accountant on the staff of the University of Leeds.

The family were Methodists, and on Sundays, Priestley was required to attend two religious services and Sunday school. They were also passionate cricket players. Stanley was regarded as a good bowler and Donald played for Gloucestershire from 1909 to 1910. Priestley himself would later play for the University College, Bristol, and captain the staff team at the University of Leeds.

Education 
Priestley, along with his brothers, was educated at his father's school in Tewkesbury. He passed his Cambridge Local Examination in December 1897 with unremarkable third class honours. In July 1898, he passed an elementary examination in Pitman shorthand, before taking a physical geography course at the Science Hall on Oldbury Road, Tewkesbury. He passed this course with first class honours in June 1899. In February 1900, he gained a first class pass in the University of London matriculation examination. In July 1901, the University College, Bristol, awarded him a Capper Pass metallurgical scholarship of twentyfive pounds (equivalent to  pounds in 2019).

Though primarily a botany student, Priestley took courses in chemistry and physics at Bristol, and in August 1901, he gained a first class pass in the University of London intermediate science examination. In November 1902, the college awarded him a John Stewart Scholarship, and in the following month, he was elected to the committee of the college's chemical society. In November 1903, Priestley passed his final BSc examination with first class honours in botany. In the same month, he was awarded a probationary bursary worth seventy pounds, by the Commissioners for the Exhibition of 1851, to study the cell biology of rust fungi.

Career 

In November 1904, Priestley was made an associate of the college. In January 1905, he was appointed temporary lecturer in botany, in succession to George Brebner, who had died on 23 December 1904. This appointment was made permanent by the college council on 19July 1905 at an annual salary of £120. He and Raymond, who was then studying geography at the college, lodged together for two years on the top floor of a Bristol boarding house. They lived on fifty shillings a week and lunch would often consist of a bun and a glass of milk.

Priestley's early research examined the process and products of photosynthesis. In 1906, he published a paper with Francis Usher, later a reader in colloid chemistry at the University of Leeds, that postulated that chlorophyll in vitro is reduced to formaldehyde in the presence of carbon dioxide and light. Vernon Herbert Blackman, professor of botany at the University of Leeds whom Priestley would succeed in 1911, considered the evidence unsatisfactory. Charles Horne Warner, working in Blackman's laboratory, found that the formation of formaldehyde was independent of the presence of carbon dioxide, and in fact, formaldehyde was formed as a byproduct of the oxidation of chlorophyll.

In 1908, the college received a grant of fifty pounds from the Board of Agriculture to enable the biology department to conduct research on the effect of electricity on plants. In an initial experiment, Priestley ran electrical wires above plants in greenhouses at Bitton, South Gloucestershire, to demonstrate that electricity could stimulate the growth of the plants. At the time, it was thought that an electric current could increase plant respiration, transpiration, and starch formation. He noted that young wheat leaves from electrified plots were, "in the opinion of many observers, darker green than the control plants." He suggested that the darker green could result from a continuous amount of nitrates being added to the soil, in a similar manner to the oxidation of atmospheric nitrogen by lightning. In one soil test, he found three times the amount of nitrogen in the soil than in the control plots. However, it is now generally accepted that there are no beneficial effects from exposing plants to electric fields.

In 1906, Priestley was elected as honorary secretary to the Bristol Naturalists' Society. He was also president of the college's botanical club and was a local secretary for the Cotteswold Naturalists' field club. He joined the Bristol Fabian Society and was president of the Montpelier adult school. In January 1908, he was elected a fellow of the Linnean Society. In 1910, he was appointed consulting botanist to the Bath and West and Southern Counties Society, after William Carruthers had resigned in the previous year. In 1911, Priestley was appointed professor of botany at the University of Leeds, succeeding Blackman, who had left to join the Institute of Vegetable Physiology at Imperial College London. Otto Vernon Darbishire was appointed to replace Priestley as lecturer in botany at the University of Bristol. In 1914, Priestley was appointed an examiner in the Natural Sciences Tripos at Cambridge.

Priestley's university work was interrupted by World War I. He had been in command of the University Officers' Training Corps at both Bristol and Leeds, and on 9August 1914, he was sent to France with the British Expeditionary Force. In his absence, Walter Garstang, then professor of zoology at the University of Leeds, assumed responsibility for the botany department. For the remainder of the war, he served in the Intelligence Brigade of the general staff until January 1919.

On his return to Leeds, Priestley embarked on a programme of research that encompassed the structure and development of the growing points of plants, the effect of light on growth, cork formation, and plant propagation. He had been influenced by the work of Albert Frey-Wyssling on cell walls and William Henry Lang's research on plant morphology and anatomy. In 1924, he was elected president of the Yorkshire Naturalists' Union and was a member of the British Bryological Society. In December 1926, he travelled to California to teach a postgraduate course at the University of California, Berkeley. Otis Freeman Curtis came to Leeds from Cornell University, Ithaca, New York, to cover his fourmonth absence.

Priestley was a member of the British Association and was president of the botany section in 1932. He attended many of the association's annual meetings, including the 1924 meeting in Toronto, Ontario, where he took the opportunity to visit the Dominion Astrophysical Observatory at Saanich, British Columbia. In 1929, he and Lorna Scott, coauthor of Priestley's textbook , attended the association's meeting in South Africa, based at the universities of Cape Town and Witwatersrand, Johannesburg. Along with five hundred other scientists, they boarded the Union‑Castle steamship Llandovery Castle, on 27June 1929 at the Port of Tilbury. They stopped at Saint Helena, in the South Atlantic Ocean, to the west of southwestern Africa, where they collected a number of bryophyte specimens.

In 1922, Priestley was appointed dean of the faculty of science, and later, became the first warden to the male students at Leeds. On 1July 1935, he succeeded Paul Barbier, professor of French, as pro-vice-chancellor of the university. Matthew John Stewart, professor of paleontology, succeeded him in June 1939. In 1941, the senate appointed Priestley as provicechancellor for a second term, after Bernard Mouat Jones, then vice-chancellor, had left the University in February to complete National Service. Mouat Jones returned to the University in October and Priestley was succeeded as provicechancellor by John David Ivor Hughes, professor of law at the university.

Personal life 

Priestley married Marion Ethel Young before leaving Bristol to take up his appointment as professor of botany at the University of Leeds. Marion was the younger daughter of Anthony and Sarah Young of Eastfield Road, Cotham, Bristol. The wedding took place on 12August 1911 at the Congregational church in Bishopston, Bristol. It was a quiet ceremony, limited to close family, as his paternal grandmother, Annie, had died only a few weeks before on 26July 1911. The honeymoon was spent in West Wales. Marion Ethel was a keen amateur botanist, and along with Priestley, was a member of the British Mycological Society. She organised many social activities at the University of Leeds, including a staff dancing class and "botanical parties" to which all botany staff and students were invited. She died at Addenbrooke's Hospital, Cambridge, on 25July 1965, aged 79, and the funeral service was held on 2August 1965 at St Mary's church, Great Shelford, followed by cremation at Cambridge Crematorium.

Their elder daughter, Phyllis Mary, was born at Leeds on 25January 1920. She was educated at Lawnswood High School, Leeds, and Cheltenham Ladies' College. In 1939, she was an exhibitioner at Girton College, Cambridge, graduating with a BA degree in 1942, and a MA in 1947. She married John Carlisle Cullen, of Belfast, on 3January 1946 at St Chad's Church, Far Headingley, Leeds. Cullen was a graduate of Queen's University Belfast and a former researcher at the National Institute of Agricultural Botany at Cambridge. She died after a long illness at Clifton, Bristol, on 22May 1999. A Requiem Mass was held at Clifton Cathedral on 2June 1999 followed by cremation at South Bristol crematorium. Michael Cullen, Phyllis Mary's son and Priestley's grandson, is a former senior research fellow at the Met Office and visiting professor in mathematics at the University of Reading.

Their younger daughter, Ann Elizabeth, was born at Leeds on 14May 1923. She was educated at the same schools as her sister, and in 1942, entered Girton College as an exhibitioner to study geography. From 1944 to 1945, she was president of the Cambridge University Women's Boat Club. In 1945, she graduated with a BA and won the Thèrèse Montefiore Memorial Prize. From 1945, she was a TuckerPrice research fellow working on water erosion and was awarded a MA by the University of Cambridge in 1949. From 1946 to 1951, she was a lecturer in geography at the University of Leeds, and from 1956, was head of geography and divinity at Perse School for Girls, Panton Street, Cambridge. By 1954, she was a member of the Institute of British Geographers, and in 1966, she was secretary to the Cambridge branch of the Christian Education Movement. She later joined the Cambridgeshire and Isle of Ely Naturalists' Trust and was clerk of Great Shelford parish council. She died at York on 27January 1986 and was cremated at York crematorium. Her ashes were interred at Lawnswood cemetery in Leeds.

Death and legacy 

At the end of December 1935, Priestley was seriously ill and underwent a major operation on 16January 1936. He died after a long illness at his home in Weetwood, Leeds, on 31October 1944, and the funeral was held at Lawnswood crematorium in the morning on 3November 1944. A large number of university staff attended including Mouat Jones, Bonamy Dobrée, and Arthur Stanley Turberville. There were also representatives from the Joint Matriculation Board, the Forestry Commission, and James Digby Firth represented the Yorkshire Naturalists' Union and the Leeds Naturalists' Club. Priestley's ashes were later scattered on the gardens of rest at the crematorium. Lorna Scott managed the botany department for eighteen months until Irene Manton was appointed on 15January 1946.

After Priestley's death, a memorial trust fund was established to provide grants to botany students at the University of Leeds. In December 1946, his brother Raymond, then vicechancellor of the University of Birmingham, gifted money to Tewkesbury Grammar School to provide for an annual science prize, named the "Joseph Hubert Priestley Prize" in memory of his brother. Priestley's collection of fossils now forms part of the herbarium at the Leeds Discovery Centre. A major part of the collection was formed from a bequest made to the University of Leeds by Ida Mary Roper, Priestley's friend and colleague from University College, Bristol.

Edward Cocking, a British plant scientist, has described Priestley as "a highly unorthodox physiological botanist", and Priestley was often the first to admit that some of his early work had been published prematurely. Nevertheless, he was a gifted teacher who attracted many graduate research students to Leeds. Lorna Scott wrote in his obituary:

Selected publications

Books and reports 
  See also Vladimir Nikolaevich Lyubimenko.
  See William Bateson.

Effect of electricity 
  Priestley was also the honorary secretary society and editor of the journal.
 
 
  Received 16 May 1914.
  Communicated by John Bretland Farmer, . Received 13 February 1913. Refereed by Arthur Harden in February 1913.

Photosynthesis 
  Communicated by Morris William Travers, . Received 16 December 1905. Refereed by Horace Tabberer Brown in January 1906.
  Communicated by Morris William Travers, . Received 30 April 1906. Refereed by Horace Tabberer Brown in May 1906.
  Communicated by Morris William Travers, . Received 13 April 1911.

Disease

Salt tolerance 
  Halophytes that grow on the banks of the Severn Estuary.

Anatomy of plants 
 
 
 
 
 
 
 
  Authority: José Mariano de Conceição Vellozo.

Composition of the cell wall 
  Communicated by Frederick Frost Blackman, . Received 25 April 1923. Refereed by William Lawrence Balls in May 1923.
 
 
  Communicated by Frederick Frost Blackman, . Received 13 April 1926. Refereed by Vernon Herbert Blackman in April 1926.

Light and growth

Forestry

Vegetative propagation 
  Masters Lectures for 1925. Read 7 April 1925 and 23 June 1925.

Cambial tissue activity 
  Communicated in September 1928 at the British Association meeting in Glasgow to a joint meeting of Sections D, I and K, and organised by the Society for Experimental Biology.
  The paper was communicated to the Department of Forestry (K section), at the British Science Association meeting at Glasgow in September 1928.

See also

Footnotes

References

Further reading

External links 
 Past head teachers of the Abbey House school at Tewkesbury, via the Old Theocsbrian Society, the alumni association for the school. The article includes a photograph of Priestley's father, Joseph Edward.
 The Irene Manton and Ida Roper plant collection at the Leeds Discovery Centre.
 Lorna Scott and her Mortar Board by Margaret Stewart, for Egham Museum, on botanist Lorna Scott, Priestley's collaborator at Leeds during the 1930s.

1883 births
1944 deaths
20th-century British botanists
20th-century British scientists
Academics of the University of Bristol
Academics of the University of Leeds
Alumni of the University of Bristol
British Army personnel of World War I
British Mycological Society
Bryologists
Companions of the Distinguished Service Order
English botanists
English foresters
English Methodists
English mycologists
Fellows of the Linnean Society of London
Knights of the Order of the Crown (Belgium)
Members of the British Bryological Society
Members of the Fabian Society
Members of the Yorkshire Naturalists' Union
Military personnel from Gloucestershire
People from Leeds
People from Tewkesbury
Scientists from Bristol